The surname Thom is of Scottish origin, from the city of Aberdeen, Aberdeenshire and Angus, and is a sept of the Clan MacThomas.

Thom is also a first-name variant of the abbreviation "Tom" of "Thomas" that holds the "h".

People with the surname
 Alexander Thom (disambiguation), multiple people
 Andreas Thom (b. 1965), former German football player
 Bing Thom (b. 1940), Canadian architect
 Cameron E. Thom (1825–1915), early settler in California, Confederate officer and lawyer
 Charles Thom (1872–1956), US microbiologist and mycologist with the standard author abbreviation "Thom"
 Cristy Thom (b. 1971), American model, actress and artist
 Françoise Thom (born 1951), French historian and Sovietologist
 Graeme Thom (born 1967), Zimbabwean cricketer
 H. B. Thom (c. 1905–1983), South African rector and Chancellor of the Stellenbosch University
 James Thom (disambiguation), multiple people
 Jess Thom (b. 1980), English comedian
 John Thom (soldier) (1891–1941), British lieutenant-colonel, judge and politician
 John Hamilton Thom (1808–1894), Irish Unitarian minister
 John Nichols Thom (1799–1838), Cornish wine-merchant and maltster
 John Watson Triplett Thom (1769–1855), American planter and politician
 Joseph Pembroke Thom (1828–1899), American politician and physician
 Karl Thom (1893-1945), German flying ace
 Linda Thom (b. 1943), Canadian Olympic gold medal-winning shooter
 Margaret Thom, Deputy Commissioner of the Northwest Territories, Canada
 Randy Thom, American sound design
 René Thom (1923–2002), French mathematician
 Robert Thom (engineer) (1774–1847), Scottish hydraulic engineer
 Robert Thom (disambiguation), multiple people
 Ronald Thom (1923–1986), Canadian architect
 Sandi Thom (b. 1981), Scottish singer-songwriter
 William Thom (disambiguation), multiple people

People with the nickname or given name
 Thom Andersen (born 1943), American filmmaker, film critic and teacher
 Thom Adcox-Hernandez (born 1960), American actor
 Thom Barry, American actor
 Thomas Thom Bell (born 1943), Jamaican-born American songwriter, arranger and producer, one of the creators of the Philadelphia style of soul music
 Thomas Thom Brennaman (born 1963), American sportscaster
 Thom Bresh, (born 1948), American country singer and guitarist
 Thom Browne (born 1965), American fashion designer
 Thom Christopher (born 1940), American actor
 Thomas Thom Darden (born 1950), American retired National Football League player
 Thomas Thom Dornbrook (born 1956), American retired National Football League player
 Thom Eberhardt (born 1947), American film director, producer and screenwriter
 Thom Evans (born 1985), Scottish former international rugby union player
 Thomas Thom Fitzgerald (born 1968), American-Canadian film and theatre director, screenwriter, playwright and producer
 Thom Flodqvist, Swedish professional ice hockey player
 Thomas Thom Gimbel, American musician best known as a member of the rock band Foreigner
 Thomas Thom de Graaf (born 1957), Dutch jurist and politician, former Deputy Prime Minister (2003-2005)
 Thomson Thom Gunn (1929–2004), English poet
 Thomas Thom Hartmann (born 1951), American radio host, author, former psychotherapist, entrepreneur and political commentator
 Thom Haye (born 1995), Dutch footballer
 Thom Jones (1945–2016), American writer, primarily of short stories
 Thomas Thom Mathews (born 1958), American actor
 Thom Noble (born 1936), British film editor
 Thom Racina, American television writer and novelist
 Thomas Thom Russo (born 1969), American record producer, engineer, mixer and songwriter
 Thomas Thom Schuyler (born 1952), American songwriter and singer
 Thomas Thom Tillis (born 1960), American politician, Senator from North Carolina
 Thomas Thom Yorke (born 1968), English musician, singer and principal songwriter of the alternative rock band Radiohead

People with the stage name or pseudonym
 Thom Hell, Norwegian singer-songwriter Thomas Helland (born 1976)
 Thom Hoffman, Dutch actor and photographer Thomas Antonius Cornelis Ancion (born 1957)

Fictional characters
 Thom Kallor, a DC Comics superhero
Thom Merrilin, a gleeman in Robert Jordan's book series The Wheel of Time
 Thom Pain, the titular protagonist of Will Eno's one man play Thom Pain (based on nothing)
 Thom Rainier, a character from the Dragon Age video game series

See also 

 Blessed Gerard (c. 1040–1120), founder of the Knights Hospitaller, erroneously attributed with the surname Thom
 Thomsen, a Danish surname
 Thomson (surname)
Thon (name)
 Thorn (surname)

Scottish surnames
Masculine given names
Hypocorisms
Lists of people by nickname
Surnames from given names